The Pakistan Day Parade also known as the National Day Joint Services Parade is an annual event held at Shakarparian in the Pakistani capital of Islamabad on the occasion of the Pakistan Day. It specifically celebrates the anniversary of the Lahore Resolution of 1940. It is overseen by the President of Pakistan as well as the Prime Minister of Pakistan.

The two are accompanied by Chairman of Joint Chiefs of Staff Committee (JCSC), the Army Staff Chief, Naval Staff Chief, and Air Force Staff Chief as well as foreign guests on occasion. It is organised by Joint Staff Headquarters (JS HQ).

History

Between its inception and 2008, the parade was held at various venues in the country. These include Constitution Avenue, Jinnah Avenue and the Race Course Grounds in Rawalpindi. Over two weeks prior to the parade in 1980, a conspiracy to assassinate President Muhammad Zia-ul-Haq by Major General Tajammul Hussain Malik during the ceremony was foiled. In 2008, the parade was suspended for an extended period of time due to the growing terrorism in the country and fears that an attack on the parade was imminent.

After a 7-year break, it was reconstituted in 2015 on the 75th anniversary. This decision was made in part to the anniversary's significance as well as the success of Operation Zarb-e-Azb by the Pakistan Army. As a precaution however, phone networks were blocked to thwart militants mobile cellular signals that could trigger bombs.

The parade was cancelled due political situation in the country in 1969 and 1971. In 1972 and 2002 the parade was not held due to military’s deployment on the borders. In 2003 and 2004 the parade was not held once again due to regional situation, including war in Iraq and Afghanistan and sudden spike in terrorism in Pakistan

In 1975 and 1994 the parade was cancelled due to inclement weather. 

The parade was cancelled in 2020 due to the outbreak of the coronavirus in Pakistan, with the cancellation being an attempt to mitigate the fall out from the pandemic. 

The 2021 parade was postponed due to "inclement weather and rain" and was rescheduled to March 25.

Details

The first Republic Day parade, as it was then called, was held on 23 March 1956 to mark the day when Pakistan became a republic on the same day. The parade was held at Karachi where newly appointed President of Pakistan Iskander Ali Mirza took salute. Simoultaneously the parades were held in other major cities and military garrisons. Commander-in-Chief of the Pakistan Army General Ayub Khan took salute in Rawalpindi. Local Governors or military commanders took salute in Lahore, Peshawar, Quetta, Multan, Bahawalpur, Rahim Yar Khan and Jhelum. 

The central parade where the President took salute continued to be held at Karachi till 1960 while C-in-C of the army took salute at Rawalpindi. In 1961, the Republic Day was named Pakistan Day. The central Joint Services parade was held for the first time at Dhaka Race course where President Ayub Khan took salute. In 1963 the central parade was held at Fortress Stadium Lahore.

The central parade has been held at Rawalpindi from 1964 to 1989. The parade was shifted to Islamabad in 1990. The parade is led by a Parade Commander who is an officer from the Pakistan Army holding the rank of a Brigadier, usually a Brigade Commander or a Station Commander. 

The Sherdils from the Pakistan Air Force Academy at Risalpur take part in the ceremony annually, performing formation aerobatics. On the planes used by the group, the Hongdu JL-8, has been showcased at the parade since 1994.

Other aircraft such as the CAC/PAC JF-17 Thunder have also been unveiled at the parade.

Bands from the armed forces that are present include the Pakistan Military Academy Band (PMA Band), the Pakistan Armed Forces Band and the Pakistan Air Force Band.

Accidents and Incidents

During the rehearsals for the planned parade on 23 March 2020, a Pakistani Air Force Wing Commander flying in an F-16 jet was killed when it crashed in a wooded area. On March 13, 2020, A missing man formation would later be flown by the PAF on 13 March to honor the pilot. 

Ironically PAF lost an aircraft during rehearsals in 1975 while the parade was later cancelled due to inclement weather on the morning of 23 March 1975.

On March 23 1987, a Mirage aircraft crashed on approach to the parade ground. Flight Lieutenant Saeed Iqbal was killed on impact.

Parade commanders
The following officers from the army have led the joint services parade (incomplete list):

Foreign representation

Foreign dignitaries who have attended the parade 
From 1985 to 2022, the following foreign dignitaries attended parade:

Foreign contingents

See also
 Lahore Resolution

References

Military parades in Pakistan
Events in Pakistan
Islamabad